Charles Kent Wilson (born January 29, 1953), also known as Uncle Charlie, is an American singer, musician, songwriter, and the former lead vocalist of the Gap Band. As a solo artist Wilson has been nominated for 13 Grammy awards and 11 NAACP Image Awards (including two wins), received a 2009 Soul Train Icon Award, and was a recipient of a BMI Icon Award in 2005. In 2009 and 2020, he was named Billboard magazine's No. 1 Adult R&B Artist, and his song "There Goes My Baby" was named the No. 1 Urban Adult Song for 2009 in Billboard Magazine.

On June 30, 2013, BET honored Wilson with a Lifetime Achievement Award that was presented to him by Justin Timberlake. The BET tribute performances included renditions of Wilson's songs performed by India Arie ("There Goes My Baby"), Jamie Foxx ("Yearning for Your Love"), and Stevie Wonder ("Burn Rubber") but it was not until Wilson himself took to the stage at the request of Timberlake to perform his Grammy-nominated song "You Are" and then transition into a medley of hit songs performing alongside Timberlake and surprise guests Snoop Dogg and Pharrell Williams that Wilson stole the show during the youth-oriented program.

Wilson is the national spokesman of the Prostate Cancer Foundation, where there is a Creativity Award in his name. The organization donates hundreds of thousands of dollars a year to cancer research across the United States.

Early life
Charlie Wilson was born in Tulsa, Oklahoma, on January 29, 1953; he was the son of the Reverend Oscar Wilson, a minister in the Church of God in Christ. With his older brother Ronnie and younger brother Robert, Wilson often sang in church before their father's Sunday sermons, accompanied on piano by their mother. He also sang in his junior high school's choir, which was a precursor to his musical career with the Gap Band and later his solo career. He attended high school at Booker T. Washington.  He attended Langston University and would go on to become drum major in the Langston University Marching Pride.

Career

The Gap Band
From the start of his career, Charlie and his brothers, Robert and Ronnie, helped define and popularize an upbeat form of funk music that was infectious and lasting with their group the Gap Band. Magicians Holiday was the debut album by The Gap Band in 1974 on Shelter Records founded by Leon Russell and Denny Cordell. The band recorded at The Church Studio, a historic recording studio in Tulsa, Oklahoma. The group's songs such as "Outstanding", "Party Train", "Yearning for Your Love", "Burn Rubber on Me", "You Dropped a Bomb on Me", and "Oops Upside Your Head" are among their immense catalog and some of the most sampled songs in music history. After 15 albums the Gap Band announced their retirement in 2010.

Solo

According to Wilson's website, rapper Snoop Dogg (with whom he is good friends) nicknamed him "Uncle Charlie". Snoop and his wife, Shante, renewed their vows in April 2008 at Wilson's 20 acre ranch outside of Los Angeles, CA.  The event inspired the music video to Wilson's hit "There Goes My Baby", which featured Snoop and his wife and was given to them as a gift symbolizing their relationship.

A few years later, Michael Paran persuaded Wilson to embark on a solo career. Paran, who is CEO of P Music Group, was responsible for rebranding the GAP Band in 1997 and repositioning them as one of the top R&B touring groups, has managed Wilson for the past 14 years

Paran and Wilson independently released Wilson's first solo album Bridging the Gap, which scored them Wilson's first No. 1 Billboard Urban Adult Contemporary single, "Without You.".  In 2004, Paran successfully negotiated a multi-album deal for Wilson with Jive Records.  The first album from that deal, Charlie, Last Name Wilson, debuted in the fall of 2005 featuring production from various hit-making producers including R. Kelly, Justin Timberlake, will.i.am, the Underdogs, Kay Gee, and the Platinum Brothers.  The album, which was certified gold by the R.I.A.A., produced the hit single, "Charlie, Last Name Wilson".

Since then, Wilson has consistently topped the Billboard Urban Adult Contemporary chart with singles from his follow up albums through P Music/Jive Records. His 2009 CD, Uncle Charlie, debuted at No. 2 on the Billboard Hot 200 and No. 1 on the Billboard R&B/Hip-Hop chart, and received two 2010 Grammy nominations: Best R&B Album and Best R&B Vocal Performance, Male for "There Goes My Baby".

In December 2010, Just Charlie, was released and spawned the hit single "You Are" which held the No. 1 spot on the Billboard Urban Adult Contemporary chart for 13 weeks as well as 15 weeks consecutively on the Mediabase chart.  The song earned two 2012 Grammy nominations, Best R&B Performance and Best R&B Song, giving Wilson, his wife Mahin, and their fellow songwriters Dennis Bettis, Carl M. Days, Jr., and Wirlie Morris (who co-produced the track with Wilson) their first nomination as songwriters together.

In the year of 1986, Wilson contributed vocals to Roger & Zapp's hit "Computer Love", a song that become a hit despite initial opposition from Wilson's label. There was a discussion between Troutman and Wilson to create a music video for the song. Unfortunately, this did not come to fruition, due to opposition from the label that Wilson was signed to at the time. The fact that both singers were from rival bands played a hand in the opposition as well. However, the two maintained their close friendship, and would perform often the song together on stage.

In 1989, Wilson worked with Eurythmics on their album We Too Are One, providing backing vocals on several tracks and co-writing the hit song "Revival". Wilson performed the song with the band on the British television chat show Wogan in August 1989. Wilson has also been a vocalist and contributor/collaborator to dozens of songs in the hip hop, rap, and R&B communities.  Wilson appeared on The Biggie Duets together with R. Kelly on the song "Mi Casa". He has worked with Snoop Dogg on numerous projects.  Their first collaboration was Snoop's 1996 album Tha Doggfather, on which Wilson appeared on four songs: "Doggfather", "Snoop Bounce", "Groupie" (also featuring 213, and "Tha Dogg Pound"), and "Snoop's Upside Ya Head". Wilson also worked with 2Pac and the Dogg Pound on an unreleased song "Just Watching" (1996), as well as "Wanted Dead Or Alive", which featured him on the hook and 2Pac & Snoop rapping. He was also featured on the Grammy-nominated single "Beautiful" (together with Pharrell) from Snoop's 2002 album Paid tha Cost to Be da Boss. Additionally, Wilson appeared on "Signs" (with Justin Timberlake) and "Perfect", both songs from Snoop's 2004 album R&G (Rhythm & Gangsta) The Masterpiece. He was also featured on Snoop's 2008 album Ego Trippin', on the songs "SD is Out" and "Can't Say Goodbye"; the latter was also performed live with Snoop and Wilson at 2008's American Idol Gives Back charity concert.

In 1998, Wilson performed on Mystikal's Ghetto Fabulous album.

In 2007, Wilson performed in two songs on UGK's Underground Kingz album: "Quit Hatin' the South" and "How Long Can It Last".

In 2010, chart-topping producer/artist, Kanye West included Wilson on his CD, My Beautiful Dark Twisted Fantasy.  Wilson recorded over a dozen songs with Kanye and appeared on the following songs:
"See Me Now", with Kanye West featuring Rhianna; "All of the Lights", with Kanye West featuring Rihanna; "Lost in the World", "Runaway", and "Monster", with Kanye West featuring Jay-Z, Nicki Minaj, and Rick Ross.  In addition to these songs, Wilson appeared on five of the G.O.O.D. Friday Releases to promote the new CD including, "Lord, Lord, Lord" with Kanye West, featuring Mos Def, Swizz Beatz, Raekwon; and "Good Friday" with Common, Pusha T, Kid Cudi, and Big Sean. He also appears on "Bound 2", the closer of Yeezus, West's 2013 album. Altogether Charlie Wilson's albums have sold over one million copies.

In 2018, Bruno Mars asked Wilson to join him on the final leg of his 24K Magic Tour. Mars also produced, co-wrote, and sang background vocals on Wilson's 2020 single release, "Forever Valentine".  The song peaked to #1 on Billboard's Adult R&B Chart.

In 2020, Wilson featured on the song "Roots" with Amine and JID, and Nas' "Car #85", from his Grammy Winning album, "King's Disease". In 2021, he featured on the song "I'll Take You On," with Brockhampton.

Support for American Servicemen and Women
In 2008, Wilson participated and performed on the ABC Television Special, America United: Supporting Our Troops, which was taped at Camp Pendleton, in California.

Wilson has made it his personal mission to support American troops, especially in the Middle East.  He and his band have traveled to Kuwait and Iraq four times (2009, 2010, and twice in 2011), taking his critically acclaimed, high energy show to dozens of bases throughout both countries and giving American military members a "little taste of home." Wilson's November 2011 trip was in response to a special request by the U.S. Armed Forces for Wilson to return to the Middle East and perform at five bases in Kuwait for the thousands of troops stationed there.

Personal life

In 1995, Wilson married Mahin Tat. They met in that same year, when she was his social worker during his time in a drug rehabilitation program. Since 1995, Wilson has been clean from his cocaine and alcohol addictions that led him into becoming homeless and to begin sleeping on the streets of Hollywood Boulevard from 1993 to 1995. In 2008, he was diagnosed with prostate cancer and treated successfully with implants. He has since worked with the Prostate Cancer Foundation, encouraging Black men to be tested for the disease. He has also spread awareness by providing vocals for Lupe Fiasco's single, titled "Mission", which focuses on cancer survivors.

Discography 

Studio albums
 You Turn My Life Around (1992)
 Bridging the Gap (2000)
 Charlie, Last Name Wilson (2005)
 Uncle Charlie (2009)
 Just Charlie (2010)
 Love, Charlie (2013)
 Forever Charlie (2015)
 In It to Win It (2017)

Awards and nominations

Grammys
Wilson has been nominated for thirteen Grammy Awards.

2018 Grammy Nomination – Best Traditional R&B Performance for "Made For Love"
2016 Grammy Nomination – Best R&B Album for Forever Charlie
2016 Grammy Nomination – Best Traditional R&B Performance for "My Favorite Part of You"
2015 Grammy Nomination – Best Rap Song (with Kanye West) for "Bound 2"
2015 Grammy Nomination – Best Rap/Sung Collaboration (with Kanye West) for "Bound 2"
2014 Grammy Nomination – Best Gospel Song for "If I Believe"
2012 Grammy Nomination – Best R&B Performance "You Are"
2012 Grammy Nomination – Best R&B Song for "You Are"
2010 Grammy Nomination – Best R&B Album for Uncle Charlie
2010 Grammy Nomination – Best Male R&B Vocal Performance for "There Goes My Baby"
2003 Grammy Nomination – Best Rap/Song Collaboration (with Pharrell & Snoop Dogg) for "Beautiful"
1997 Grammy Nomination – Best R&B Performance by a Duo or Group with Vocals (with Luke, Mr. X, Melle Mel, Yo-Yo, Chaka Khan, Da Luniz, Shaquille O'Neal, Quincy Jones & Coolio) for "Stomp"
1983 Grammy Nomination – Best R&B Instrumental Performance for "Where Are We Going"

NAACP Image Awards
2021 NAACP Image Award Nomination - Outstanding Male Artist
2018 NAACP Image Award WINNER - Music Makes A Difference Honor
2018 NAACP Image Award Nomination - Outstanding Male Artist
2018 NAACP Image Award Nomination - Outstanding Album for In It To Win It
2018 NAACP Image Award Nomination - Outstanding Duo, Group, or Collaboration for "I'm Blessed" 
2016 NAACP Image Award Nomination – Outstanding Male Artist
2016 NAACP Image Award Nomination – Outstanding Album for Forever Charlie
2016 NAACP Image Award Nomination – Outstanding Song Traditional for "Goodnight Kisses"
2014 NAACP Image Award WINNER – Outstanding Album for Love, Charlie
2014 NAACP Image Award Nomination – Outstanding Male Artist
2010 NAACP Image Award Nomination – Outstanding Male Artist

Honors
November 5, 2013 – SoulTracks Reader's Choice Award – Major Label Album of the Year – Charlie Wilson 'Love, Charlie'
June 30, 2013 – Lifetime Achievement Award presented to Charlie Wilson at the BET Awards
January 2013 – Lifetime Achievement Award presented to Charlie Wilson by the Trumpet Awards Foundation
December 2011 – Billboard Magazine names Charlie Wilson the No. 2 Adult R&B Artist for 2011
December 2011 – Billboard Magazine names "You Are" the No. 2 Urban Adult Song for 2011
December 2011 – Mediabase names Charlie Wilson No. 1 Adult R&B Artist for 2011
December 2011 – Mediabase names "You Are" the No. 1 Urban Adult Song for 2011
February 2010 – NAACP Image Award Nomination for Outstanding Male Artist
December 2009 – Billboard Magazine names Charlie Wilson No. 1 Adult R&B Artist for 2009
December 2009 – Billboard Magazine names "There Goes My Baby" the No. 1 Urban Adult Song for 2009
November 2009 – Soul Train Icon Award presented to Charlie Wilson
September 2005 – BMI Icon Award presented to Charlie Wilson

References

External links
Bio of Charlie Wilson at pmusicgroup.com

 
 
Charlie Wilson in-depth interview by Pete Lewis, 'Blues & Soul' August 2011
Charlie Wilson 2011 Audio Interview at Soulinterviews.com
Charlie Wilson 2013 Audio Interview at Soulinterviews.com
Charlie Wilson 2011 Interview at Soulrnb.com (French)

1953 births
Jive Records artists
American contemporary R&B singers
American multi-instrumentalists
American soul singers
American funk singers
APRA Award winners
Booker T. Washington High School (Tulsa, Oklahoma) alumni
Living people
Musicians from Tulsa, Oklahoma
American hip hop singers
Singer-songwriters from Oklahoma
African-American male singer-songwriters
21st-century African-American male singers
20th-century African-American male singers